One Special Night is a 1999 American made-for-television drama film directed by Roger Young, adapted by Nancey Silvers from the play A Winter Visitor by Jan Hartman, and starring James Garner and Julie Andrews. The plot involves two strangers, a construction contractor (Garner) and a Pediatric Cardiologist (Andrews), who take refuge in a small abandoned cabin during a stormy winter night and, despite their many differences, they become undeniably drawn to one another. This was Garner's and Andrews' third film pairing as romantic leads, after The Americanization of Emily (1964) and Victor Victoria (1982).

Plot
The movie plot is as follows:

Two strangers take refuge in a small cabin during a blizzard and, despite their many differences, discover that fate has brought them together. It's Thanksgiving Day and both Dr. Catherine Howard and Robert Woodward wind up at the same medical facility—one still missing a loved one, the other visiting a dying spouse.  
Although they have lived within miles of each other for years, they have never met. Outside, snow has begun to fall and, despite a brusque first encounter, Catherine offers Robert a ride home when she learns that he is stranded. The pair gets off to a rocky start as Catherine tries to maneuver the car through what is now a blizzard and Robert barks directions. 
Suddenly, the car careens off the road into a snow bank. They trudge through the blizzard and discover an empty cabin. They wait out the storm and begin to break through each other's shells.
First thing the following morning they are discovered by one of his daughters and her husband.  They give Catherine a drive back to her home and they agree to meet the following Sunday.

On the following Sunday Catherine gets dressed and then gets in her truck and drives to Murray's.  It is a restaurant they both know and frequent.  She orders his suggested Chocolate Chip pancakes and waits for him.  He too gets ready to go and meet her that Sunday morning.  When he gets to the front of Murray's his cellphone rings.  His wife has had another heart attack.
The next scene is when Robert is hosting the wake for his wife, who passed on that Sunday.  Both of his daughters are at the wake and the pregnant daughter Lori (Stacy Grant) sits on the floor in the kitchen and cries.  Her sister Jaclyn comes over and comforts her.  Lori is eight months pregnant and going through a divorce.
The next scenes show that time has moved on a bit and now we are past the funeral.  The next thing we see is that Dr. Howard is receiving a telephone call to let her know that a young lady is going into a troubled labor.  She drives to the hospital only to find that Robert is the one who called her.  She is asked if it was okay.  She then stands to head to the daughter and Robert asks if she went to the diner that Sunday.  She replied that she did not go, that she had been too busy. She asked if he went.  He says that he did go but was called away while he was there.  Then she discovers that Robert's wife died that day.
He says that he would like to show her something.  They go out to where his truck is parked.  He pulls out a box.  She opens it and there is a necklace.  It is exactly like the one thought she lost the night they went off the road.  She thinks that, and says that, as she asks where he bought it.  He explains that it is the necklace she lost and then shows her the neck scarf she placed on the tree near where she lost it.

Robert asks her if she has a few moments.  Catherine says that it is Christmas Day so her schedule is free.  They both got into his truck and drove through the icy roads.  Sure enough, His truck gets stuck right near where they broke down the year before.  She looks to the roof of the cabin and smoke is coming from the chimney.
They both walk to the front door.  She knocks, and when nobody answers, He walks around and breaks another window.  He comes to the front door and opens it.  She is curious about why they are here again.  Then he explains that the previous owners of the cabin actually did sell the cabin to Robert this past year.  Now he had a place to go into whenever he is stuck on this road.
The last scene is Catherine and Robert standing inside the living room area of the log cabin and kissing.

Cast

External links
 One Special Night in the Internet Movie Database

1999 television films
1999 films
1999 drama films
American Christmas films
CBS network films
Christmas television films
American films based on plays
Films directed by Roger Young
Films shot in Montreal
American drama television films
1990s English-language films
1990s American films